is a 2000 Japanese anime film produced by Shin-Ei Animation. It is the 8th film of the anime series Crayon Shin-chan. Keiichi Hara directed this film and also wrote the screenplay.

Plot
Shinnosuke and his parents including Shiro along with his friends and families go on a cruise to for several days to meet the actor of the character Action Kamen and watch the latest film of Action Kamen. But a group of monkeys raid the ship and all of the adults who are present at the ship above 18 years are taken to an island at night. Shinnosuke and his friends including Himawari and Shiro start their journey to rescue all of them. They meet Paradise King, who is controlling the monkeys. They succeed to rescue them and return to ship, but Paradise King attacks them back. Shinnosuke and Action Kamen fight back and defeat him. Later all of them enjoy the Action Kamen film.

Cast
Akiko Yajima as Shinnosuke Nohara
Keiji Fujiwara as Hiroshi Nohara
Miki Narahashi as Misae Nohara
Satomi Kōrogi as Himawari Nohara
Mari Mashiba as Toru Kazama and Shiro
Tamao Hayashi as Nene Sakurada
Teiyū Ichiryūsai as Masao Sato
Chie Satō as Bo Suzuki
Akio Ōtsuka as Paradise King
Tesshō Genda as Gotarō aka Action Kamen
Etsuko Kozakura as Mimiko Sakura
 Sakiko Tamagawa as Toru's mother
 Junko Hagimori as Nene's mother
 Tomoko Otsuka as Masao's mother 
 Ayako Kawasumi as Ai Suotome
 Fumihiko Tachiki as Kuroiso: bodyguard of Ai
 Yumi Takada as Midori Yoshinaga
 Michie Tomizawa as Ume Matsuzaka
 Kotono Mitsuishi as Masumi Ageo
 Rokurō Naya as Bunta Takakura: principal of Futaba Kindergarten
 Hisako Kyōda as Kasukabe bookstore manager 
 Sakurako Kishiro as Nakamura: Kasukabe bookstore worker
 Kazue Ikura as Ryuko Fukazumi
 Chizuko Hoshino as Ogin Uonome
 Akiko Muta as Mary
 Sayuri Yamauchi as Nanako Oohara
 Daisuke Sakaguchi as Yoshirin Hatogaya 
 Fumie Kusachi as Micchi Hatogaya
 Ginzō Matsuo as Ginnosuke Nohara
 Reiko Suzuki as Reiko Kitamoto aka aunt next door: neighbour of the Nohara family
 Kōsuke Okano as Someya
 Hiroshi Masuoka as Dr. North Kasukabe
 Miki Itō as TV narrator
 Kan ​Tokumaru as Captain
 Takeharu Onishi, Tetsuya Iwanaga, Jin Domon as ship officer
 Fumihiko Tachiki as strongest phantom
 Sachiko Kobayashi as Pegasus

Characters

Monkeys
They stays on the island. They worked for Paradise King and kidnapped all the adults from the ship. After being defeated by humans, they stopped working for Paradise King, when Shinnosuke pretended to be Paradise King and told them to lead their lives freely.

Paradise King
A resident of the island. When he reached to the island, the monkeys staying there attacked him. After a huge battle, Paradise King managed to defeat them and started controlling the monkeys. He was defeated by Shinnosuke and Action Kamen when he tried to drown the ship using dynamite from his glider.

Release 
The film was released on 22 April 2000 in Japan. It was also released in India with the title Shin-chan: Bungle in the Jungle on April 1, 2011 at theaters. It was released as Crayon ShinChan The Movie: Storming Jungle with English subtitles on VCD by PMP Entertainment.

See also 

 List of Crayon Shin-chan films
 List of Crayon Shin-chan characters

References

External links 

  
 

Films directed by Keiichi Hara
Jungle That Invites Storm
2000s action comedy films
2000 anime films
2000 films